Aïda Mbaye was a Senegalese politician.

Alongside Arame Diène and Ramatoulaye Seck, Mbaye was elected to the National Assembly in 1983; all three women became known for their political abilities despite a lack of formal education. A native of Saint-Louis, she was a member of the Socialist Party of Senegal, and served as an official for the regional union of Tambacounda at the time of her nomination and election.

References

Year of birth missing
Possibly living people
People from Saint-Louis, Senegal
People from Tambacounda Region
Socialist Party of Senegal politicians
Senegalese women in politics
20th-century Senegalese women politicians
20th-century Senegalese politicians